Pakaraimoideae is a subfamily of the flowering plant family Cistaceae with just one genus and a single species, Pakaraimaea dipterocarpacea, from Guyana, and Venezuela in South America. It is found in the Imbaimadai Savanna, the adjacent Partang Savanna, the Guaianan highlands and Pacaraima Mountains in Guyana and Bolivar State in Venezuela.
It was formerly placed in Dipterocarpaceae, but is now known to belong to Cistaceae

References

Cistaceae
Rosid subfamilies